Silvia Scalia (born 16 July 1995) is an Italian swimmer who won two medals at the 2019 Summer Universiade.

Biography
Scalia won also two medals at the 2018 Mediterranean Games and a medal with the relay team at the Short Course Worlds.

At the 2022 European Aquatics Championships, held in Rome in August, she won the silver medal in the 50 metre backstroke with a time of 27.53 seconds, finishing less than three-tenths of a second behind gold medalist Analia Pigrée of France.

See also
 Italy at the 2019 Summer Universiade
 Italy at the 2018 Mediterranean Games

References

External links
 Silvia Scalia at SwimSwam

1995 births
Living people
Italian female swimmers
Universiade medalists in swimming
Universiade gold medalists for Italy
Universiade bronze medalists for Italy
Mediterranean Games gold medalists for Italy
Mediterranean Games silver medalists for Italy
Mediterranean Games medalists in swimming
Swimmers at the 2018 Mediterranean Games
Medalists at the 2019 Summer Universiade
European Aquatics Championships medalists in swimming
21st-century Italian women